XEBAL-AM is a radio station in Bécal, Campeche, Mexico. It broadcasts on 1470 AM and is known as La Voz Maya de México.

History
The idea of forming a radio station in Bécal first came forth in the 1960s, led by Josué and Azael Uc Canul. However, the government demanded more legal requirements than they could supply at the time. In 1977, Cadena Cultural Becaleña, A.C., was formed. In 1978, it obtained a permit; the next year, the station bought a 1 kW transmitter from Pennsylvania in the United States.

On March 4, 1980, XEBAL-AM 1470 took to the air, becoming the first radio station in the municipality of Calkiní. It initially operated from 6am to 6pm with instrumental and classical music and cultural programming. 1992 saw a new 2.5 kW transmitter being placed into service.

In 2000, the station expanded its facilities and began programming from 6am to midnight each day. Programming includes Christian evangelism, baseball and cultural and social programming.

External links

References

1980 establishments in Mexico
Radio stations established in 1980
Radio stations in Campeche
Spanish-language radio stations